It's Almost Christmas is the first Christmas album by the husband and wife duo, Jon & Valerie Guerra. Descendant Records (Sony) released the album on November 13, 2015.

Critical reception

In December 2015 (and again in December 2016), Jon & Valerie Guerra opened for Amy Grant and Vince Gill's "Christmas at the Ryman" concerts at the venerable Ryman Auditorium in Nashville, TN.

Awarding the album four stars from New Release Today, Phronsie Howell states, "Jon & Valerie did a bang-up job bringing the Christmas spirit to listeners." Of the track "Beginning to Feel like Christmas," Elmore Magazine states, "Jon and Valerie's new song is likely to find its way into your Christmas tradition." Bersain Beristain, rating the album two stars at Jesus Freak Hideout, writes, "It's Almost Christmas might have more in common with...generic holiday selections". Giving the album a nine out of ten stars for Jesus Wired, Rebekah Joy says, "Both Jon and Valerie carry such powerful, and beautiful voices, that blend together so well."

Southern Living featured the duo with an exclusive video premier, and the album has also been featured in Acoustic Guitar, Fearless Radio, Relevant Magazine, The Daily Country, and HNGN.com.

Residence 
Jon Guerra & Valerie Strattan Guerra reside in Chicago, Illinois.

Track listing

References

External links
 Story from CCM Magazine

2015 Christmas albums
Jon Guerra albums
Christmas albums by American artists
Folk Christmas albums